Felicia clavipilosa is an upright, richly branched shrub of up to  high, that is assigned to the family Asteraceae. It has alternately arranged leaves, and flower heads with 3–4 whorls of involucral bracts with many yellow disc florets in the centre. Very characteristic for the species are the short club-shaped hairs on its fruits. There are two subspecies. Subsp. clavipilosa has narrowly lance-shaped entire leaves with one vein and pale mauve ray florets. Subspecies transvaalensis has lance-shaped leaves with one or three veins and white ray florets. The species occurs in southern Africa, with subsp. clavipilosa having a western distribution in Zambia, Zimbabwe, Namibia, Botswana and South Africa, and subsp. transvaalensis restricted to the east, from Zimbabwe, through Botswana to South Africa. The subspecies transvaalensis is sometimes called pokkiesblom in Afrikaans.

Description 
The stems are woody and pale brown, but in the upper part herbaceous, green, with appressed hairs or very glandular, especially near the tips, and then with perpendicular bristles.

The flower heads sit individually at the tip of an indistinct inflorescence stalk. These stalks are up to about 2 cm long, leafy, mostly covered in protruding bristly hairs and glands. The bracts in the inner whorl are about 3 mm (0.14 in) long and  mm (0.03 in) wide, eventually hairless and have an indistinct papery margin.

About twenty five female ray florets have pale violet straps of about 5 mm (0.22 in) long and 1 mm (0.04 in) wide. In the center of the corolla of each disc floret are five anthers merged into a tube, through which the style grows when the floret opens, hoovering up the pollen on its shaft. The style in both ray- and disc florets forks, and at the tip of both style branches is a triangular appendage.

Differences between the subspecies 
Finally, the sterile cypselae are quick to lose their club-shaped hairs.

Differences with related species 
F. clavipilosa differs from all other Felicia species by the club-shaped hairs on the cypselae. It differs from F. deserti by its strongly branching habit, subsp. clavipilosa in addition differs by the always protruding bristly hairs. Young branches of F. hyssopifolia are white felty.

Taxonomy 
Rudolf Schlechter was the first to recognise the distinctiveness of this species from F. hyssopifolia, but he never published a description or name. Jürke Grau described it in his 1973 Revision of the genus Felicia, based on a collection made near Klein Windhoek in Namibia by Hermann Merxmüller and Willi Giess in 1957, and he named it Felicia clavipilosa. He described in the same publication a somewhat different form, collected by Cornelis Eliza Bertus Bremekamp and Herold Georg Wilhelm Johannes Schweickerdt at the westside of Soutpansberg in 1931, which he called F. clavipilosa subsp. transvaalensis.  The species is considered to be part of the section Felicia.

Distribution, ecology and conservation 
Felicia clavipilosa subsp.  clavipilosa occurs in Botswana, Namibia, southern and western Zimbabwe, Northern Cape and North West provinces of South Africa. In Zambia an isolated population occurs near Lusaka. In Zimbabwe it grows in open, often disturbed places in woodland and grassland.

Felicia clavipilosa subsp. transvaalensis can be found in southeastern Botswana, the Limpopo, Gauteng, and Mpumalanga provinces of South Africa, and western, central and southern Zimbabwe.

In South Africa, the continued survival of both subspecies is considered to be of least concern.

References

External links 
 line drawing of subsp. clavipilosa
 line drawing of subsp. transvaalensis
 line drawing cypsela figure 5
 distribution map of subsps. clavipilosa and transvaalensis

claviculata
Flora of Southern Africa
Flora of South Tropical Africa
Plants described in 1973